Oorum Unavum is a 2016 Indian Tamil-language cooking travel series focusing on the state of Tamil Nadu. The series was originally hosted by Sri Periya Karuppan, who was replaced by Sruti Nakul. The show premiered on 23 July 2016. It airs Saturdays at 5:30PM and is re-telecast Sundays at 11.30AM on Puthiya Thalaimurai.

List of episodes

References

External links 
 Puthiya Thalaimurai magazine website
 Puthiya Thalaimurai Youtube

Puthiya Thalaimurai TV television series
Tamil-language cooking television series
Tamil-language talk shows
Tamil-language travel shows
Tamil-language reality television series
2016 Tamil-language television series debuts
Tamil-language television shows